Warwick Gut is a  long 1st order tributary to Indian River in Sussex County, Delaware.

Course
Warwick Gut rises on the Swan Creek divide, about 0.25 miles north of Warwick in Sussex County, Delaware.  Warwick Gut then flows south to meet Indian River about 0.1 miles west of Gull Point.

Watershed
Warwick Gut drains  of area, receives about 44.9 in/year of precipitation, has a topographic wetness index of 640.69 and is about 18.3% forested.

See also
List of rivers of Delaware

References 

Rivers of Delaware